The Khost Protection Force (KPF) is an Afghan paramilitary group that has been active in eastern Afghanistan. It is the oldest of a number of highly secretive CIA-backed paramilitaries formed following the United States invasion of Afghanistan, in collaboration with the National Directorate of Security (NDS). Initially largely made up of former People's Democratic Party members, the KPF was based at Camp Chapman in the country's Khost Province and it also had battalions in Gardez and Sharana, operating in the region bordering Pakistan's North Waziristan District. 

Like other paramilitaries in Afghanistan during the 2001-2021 war, the KPF is mostly trained and recruited by the CIA despite nominally belonging to the nation's NDS; it did not come under the command chain of the Afghan National Army or the U.S. Army. The KPF has been accused of war crimes including civilian killings and torture. 

An American official speaking anonymously told The Washington Post in 2015 that the KPF “is one of the most effective elements fighting the Taliban in Afghanistan, and were it not for their constant efforts, Khost would likely be a Haqqani-held province, and Kabul would be under far greater threat than it is,”. 

In November 2015, a growing number of deadly night raids by the KPF caused a backlash by the residents in the city of Khost against the United States. 

Following the fall of Kabul, the Taliban intensified their hunt to find and kill members of the KPF in October 2021.

References

Military units and formations of the War in Afghanistan (2001–2021)
Paramilitary organisations based in Afghanistan